A platform cooperative, or platform co-op, is a cooperatively owned, democratically governed business that establishes a computing platform, and uses a website, mobile app or a protocol to facilitate the sale of goods and services. Platform cooperatives are an alternative to venture capital-funded platforms insofar as they are owned and governed by those who depend on them most—workers, users, and other relevant stakeholders.

Typology

While there is no commonly accepted typology of platform cooperatives, researchers often ontologize platform cooperatives by industry. Some potential categories include: transportation, on-demand labor, journalism, music, creative projects, timebank, film, home health care, photography, data cooperatives, marketplaces. Other typologies differentiate platform cooperatives by their governance or ownership structures.

Platform cooperatives have been contrasted with platform capitalism. Companies that try to focus on fairness and sharing, instead of just profit motive, are described as cooperatives, whereas more traditional and common companies that focus solely on profit, like Airbnb and Uber, are platform capitalists (or cooperativist platforms vs capitalist platforms). In turn, projects like Wikipedia, which rely on unpaid labor of volunteers, can be classified as commons-based peer-production initiatives.

Examples
Many platform co-operatives use business models similar to better-known apps or web services, but with a cooperative structure. For example, there are numerous driver-owned taxi apps that allow customers to submit trip requests and notify the nearest driver, similar to Uber.

The Internet of Ownership website includes a directory of the platform co-op "ecosystem".

Eva is a ride-sharing application that offers a service similar to Uber, but in line with its cooperative members priorities: cheaper for rider members and better wages for driver members.

Fairbnb.coop  is an online marketplace and hospitality service for people to lease or rent short-term lodging. Foremost, it is also a community of activists, coders, researchers and designers working to create the platform to enable hosts and guests to connect for travel and cultural exchange, while minimizing the cost to communities. It is an alternative to commercial platforms.

Fairmondo is an online marketplace for ethical goods and services, that originated from Germany and has expanded to the UK. Joining as a stakeholder is open for all and the minimum share is limited to an affordable amount, with stakeholders exercising a democratic control through one-member-one-vote principle. It is a cooperative alternative to Amazon and eBay.

Green Taxi Cooperative is the largest taxi company in the Denver metro area. Organized by the Communications Workers of America Local 7777, its members buy into the cooperative for a one-time membership fee of $2000 and then pay fees amounting to a "fraction" of what large companies charge drivers. Despite having a mobile application through which riders can schedule pickups, and thus competing directly with ride-hailing applications like Uber and Lyft, as of November 2016 the Green Taxi Cooperative reportedly held 37% market share in Denver.

Meet.coop is an open source meeting and conferencing tool.

Midata is a cooperatively owned, Zurich-based, online platform that seeks to serve as an exchange for members' medical data. Using an open-source application, members are able to securely share their medical data with doctors, friends, and researchers, and are provided access to "data analysis, visualization and interpretation tools". Members can also consent to their data's use in medical research and clinical trials. In a pilot project, post-bariatric-surgery patients are able to upload data to the platform, including their weight and daily step count, and follow their own post-surgery progress.

Savvy Cooperative is a multi-stakeholder patient-owned research insights cooperative that seeks to match patients with patient engagement leaders, digital health companies, and clinical innovation leads, enabling industry and start-up tech companies to easily conduct user research with patients to ensure the products that go-to-market are patient-centric and focused on patient needs. Using Savvy's platform, patients can find and apply for gigs that match their conditions, get reimbursed for their participation, and qualify for dividends based on their co-op participation. Savvy is majority patient-owned.

Stocksy United is a platform cooperative headquartered in Victoria, British Columbia. It is a "highly curated collection of royalty-free stock photography and video footage that is 'beautiful, distinctive, and highly usable.'" In 2015, Stocksy earned $7.9 million in sales—doubling its revenues from the year prior—and paid a dividend of $200,000 to its members.

Up & Go is a digital marketplace for professional home services that allows users to schedule services such as house cleaning, dog walking, and handywork with worker-owned businesses that have fair work practices.

Resonate is music streaming coop similar to Spotify.

Collective Tools is a cooperatively owned cloud service that offers storage, communication and canvas boards to organisations as well as storage and email to private persons.

Platform co-operativism

Platform Cooperativism is an intellectual framework and movement which advocates for the global development of platform cooperatives. Its advocates object to the techno-solutionist claim that technology is, by default, the answer to all social problems. Rather, proponents of the movement claim that ethical commitments such as the building of the global commons, support of inventive unions, and promotion of ecological and social sustainability as well as social justice, are necessary to shape an equitable and fair social economy. Platform cooperativism advocates for the coexistence of cooperatively owned business models and traditional, extractive models with the goal of a more diversified digital labor landscape respecting fair working conditions.

Platform cooperativism draws upon other attempts at digital disintermediation, including the peer-to-peer production movement, led by Michel Bauwens, Vasilis Kostakis and the P2P Foundation, which advocates for "new kinds of democratic and economic participation" that rest "upon the free participation of equal partners, engaged in the production of common resources", as well as the radically distributed, non-market mechanisms of networked peer-production promoted by Yochai Benkler. Marjorie Kelly's book Owning Our Future contributed the distinction between democratic and extractive ownership design to this discussion.

While platform cooperatives are structured as cooperatives, granting democratic control to workers, customers, users, or other key stakeholders, companies and initiatives that support the ecosystem of the cooperative platform economy are considered a part of the platform cooperativism movement insofar as they attempt to encourage, develop, and sustain its development. It has also been argued that, as the spread of platform cooperativism "will require a different kind of ecosystem—with appropriate forms of finance, law, policy, and culture—to support the development of democratic online enterprises", any person or business associated with the development of this ecosystem can be considered a proponent of platform cooperativism.

History of the term

The term "platform cooperativism" was coined by New School professor Trebor Scholz in a 2014 article titled, "Platform Cooperativism vs. the Sharing Economy", in which he criticized popular sharing economy platforms and called for the creation of democratically controlled cooperative alternatives that "allow workers to exchange their labor without the manipulation of the middleman". Shortly thereafter, journalist Nathan Schneider published an article, "Owning Is the New Sharing", which documented a variety of projects using cooperative models for digitally mediated commerce, as well as online, distributed funding-models which hoped to replace the venture capital model predominant in the technology sector. Both Scholz and Schneider would later credit the work and provocations of other researchers and digital-labor advocates as their inspiration, including, among others, lawyer Janelle Orsi of the Sustainable Economies Law Center, who had "called on technology companies in the sharing economy to share ownership and profits with their users", and Amazon Mechanical Turk organizer Kristy Milland who had proposed a worker-owned alternative to the platform at the "Digital Labor: Sweatshops, Picket Lines, Barricades" conference in November 2014.

There are several other precursors to platform cooperativism. In 2012, the Italian cooperative federation Legacoop promulgated a manifesto on the "Cooperative Commons", which called for bringing the lessons of the cooperative movement to control over online data. The same year Mayo Fuster Morell published an article named "horizons of digital commons" in which she pointed to the evolution of commons-based peer production merging with cooperatives and the social economy. The article reflects on an event named Building Digital commons, which took place in October 2011. It was the goal of the event to further connect the cooperative tradition and collaborative production. Other previous similar terms on new forms of cooperativism such as "open cooperativism" and also studies of how the digital environment opens up new possibilities for the cooperative tradition are of relevance to the new term platform cooperativism.

In 2015, Scholz published a primer on platform cooperativism, "Platform Cooperativism: Challenging the Corporate Sharing Economy", which was published in five languages and helped to internationalize the concept. In 2016, he published Uberworked and Underpaid: How Workers Are Disrupting the Digital Economy, which further developed the concept. Together, Scholz and Schneider went on to convene an event on the subject, "Platform Cooperativism. The Internet. Ownership. Democracy", at The New School in November 2015, and edit a book, Ours to Hack and to Own: The Rise of Platform Cooperativism, a New Vision for the Future of Work and a Fairer Internet.

Roots in criticism of the sharing economy 
Proponents of platform cooperativism claim that, by ensuring the financial and social value of a platform circulate among these participants, platform cooperatives will bring about a more equitable and fair digitally mediated economy in contrast with the extractive models of corporate intermediaries.

The concept of platform cooperativism emerged from the discourse surrounding digital labor, popular in the late 2000s and early 2010s, which critiqued the use of digitally mediated labor markets to evade traditional labor protections. Early studies of digital labor, using the theories of Italian Workerists, focused on the "free" or "immaterial" labor performed by users of Web 2.0 platforms (sometimes referred to as "playbor"), while later analyses served to critique the "crowd fleecing" of digital laborers by microtask labor-brokerages such as Amazon Mechanical Turk and Crowdflower.

In 2014, the digital labor discourse shifted to the so-called "sharing economy", resulting in an increase in both academic and media attention to the practices and policies of online markets for labor, services, and goods. Researchers and labor advocates argued that platforms such as Uber and TaskRabbit were unfairly classifying full-time workers as independent contractors rather than employees, thus avoiding legally granted labor protections such as minimum-wage laws and the right to join a union with which to engage in collective bargaining, as well as different benefits offered to workers with employee status, including time off, unemployment insurance, and healthcare.

Other research focused on the automated management of the digital workplace by algorithms, without worker recourse. For example, the wage-per-mile by drivers on the Uber platform is controlled moment-to-moment by a surge pricing algorithm, and its drivers can lose their jobs if they fall behind any one of a number of metrics logged by the platform including ride-acceptance percentage (minimum 90%) and customer-rating (4.7 out of 5). Sharing economy workers who complained about this algorithmic management were often ignored, (e.g. a TaskRabbit discussion forum was shut down in response to worker unrest) and sometimes told that, insofar as the platform owners do not employ their contracted labor force, they were not actually being managed by the technology companies behind the platforms on which they worked.

Insofar as platform cooperatives offer worker-owners a more robust degree of control of the platforms they use, the model was seen as offering an ethical alternative to existing sharing economy platforms. As these early critiques of the sharing economy remain relevant, platform cooperatives tend to highlight their efforts to provide their worker-owners with a living wage or a fair share of revenues, benefits, control over the platform's design, and democratic influence over the management of the cooperative business.

Public policy

The platform cooperativism movement has seen a number of global policy proposals and successes.

Spain

Barcelona 

Barcelona has a long tradition of connecting cooperativism and collaborative production. On 30 October 2011, an event was held to "Promote dialogue between the cooperative tradition and digital commons".

The Social Economy and Consumption Commission of Barcelona City Council in 2015 started a program on platform cooperativism. The program includes the provision of match-funding to support entrepreneurship and "La Communificadora", an entrepreneurship training and support course, among others. 
 
A March 2016 international event by BarCola (node about Collaborative Economy and Commons-Based Peer Production in Barcelona) produced a set of 120 policy proposals for European governments. Integrated as concrete actions for the Municipal Action Plan of the Barcelona City Council, following a consultative online participatory process, as well as aiming at other local authorities in Spain and the Government of Catalonia, the resulting document criticized the organizational rationale of "multinational corporations based in Silicon Valley" which, though similar to collaborative-Commons economic models, "behave in the style of the prevailing globalized capitalist economic model, based on extracting profits through networked collaboration".

That joint statement of public policies for the collaborative economy, which integrates a Commons-oriented vision in such an emerging paradigm, claimed that by privatizing certain aspects of the collaborative Commons model these companies created "severe inequalities and loss of rights". The organization and participants at the event proposed the creation of favorable regulations for truly collaborative economic models, with measures like the funding of an incubator of new projects in the collaborative economy, including platform cooperativism, as well as the reassigning of public spaces for jointly managed working and manufacturing spaces. Embedded in a wider framework of action research for the co-design of public policies, some of these policy proposals have been met with support by members of the Barcelona city government. Outputs from that process have resulted in specific measures like the incubation of new collaborative economy initiatives following a cooperativist model, or the possibility of new funding schemes for civic projects via transparent "match-funding".

United States

NYC Council Member Brad Lander of Brooklyn's 39th District, founding co-chair of the Council's Progressive Caucus, released a report in 2016 entitled, "Raising the Floor for Workers in the Gig Economy: Tools for NYC & Beyond", which analyzes the contingent work sector in New York City and "presents policy tools for cities seeking to protect gig workers from wage theft and discrimination, provide access to portable benefits, and establish new frameworks for worker organizing". Under his leadership, the NYC Council unanimously passed the "Freelance Isn't Free Act", which provides freelance workers with a right to full and timely payment, along with new tools for enforcement, and amendments to the NYC Human Rights law to clarify that employment protections apply to independent and contingent workers. In his report, NYC Council Member Brad Lander presented platform cooperativism as a model to help laborers in the digital economy.

The US Department of Agriculture appeared to offer its support for the platform cooperativism movement with a feature story in the September/October 2016 issue of its magazine, Rural Cooperatives.

"Rural Americans have been organizing cooperatives to develop countervailing economic power against larger investor-owned corporations for more than a century. This cooperative movement has now moved into the sharing economy that has been developing throughout the country. Wherever investor-owners of software platforms are satisfying the needs of rural asset owners and users, the sharing economy will be welcomed. However, when the need arises, cooperatively-owned software platforms are proving to be a viable alternative."

United Kingdom

In 2016, Jeremy Corbyn, leader of the Labour Party and the Opposition in the United Kingdom, released a digital democracy manifesto calling for, among other policies, the fostering of "the cooperative ownership of digital platforms for distributing labour and selling services". He proposed that the National Investment Bank, as well as regional banks, would "finance social enterprises whose websites and apps are designed to minimise the costs of connecting producers with consumers in the transport, accommodation, cultural, catering and other important sectors of the British economy".

Advocacy

Organizations
Platform Cooperativism Consortium (PCC)

The Platform Cooperativism Consortium is a "think-and-do tank" for the platform cooperativism movement based at The New School in New York City. As a "global network of researchers, platform co-ops, independent software developers, artists, designers, lawyers, activists, publishing outlets, and funders", it engages in research, advocacy, education, and technology-based projects. It was launched in November 2016 at the occasion of the "Building the Cooperative Internet" conference.

The Internet of Ownership

Beginning in 2016, The Internet of Ownership was a website that included a global directory of platform cooperatives and a calendar of events concerning the platform cooperativism movement. It was maintained by Nathan Schneider and Devin Balkind. In 2020, the Internet of Ownership directory stopped being maintained and was superseded by the Platform Cooperativism Consortium's directory of platform cooperatives.

Campaigns 
In September 2016, Nathan Schneider wrote the article "Here's my plan to save Twitter: let's buy it" in which he asked "What if users were to band together and buy Twitter for themselves?" Once in users' hands, Schneider suggested, Twitter could be turned into a platform co-op.

Criticisms of the viability of platform cooperatives

Dominance of established players

Some critics of platform cooperativism claim that platform cooperatives will have trouble challenging established, venture-capital-funded platforms. Nick Srnicek writes that, due to "the monopolistic nature of platforms, the dominance of network effects, and the vast resources behind these companies ... even if all that software would be made open-source, a platform like Facebook would still have the weight of its existing data, network effects, and financial resources to fight off any co-op arrival." Rufus Pollock expresses similar concerns that platform coops will face major challenges reaching adequate scale, particularly given their inability to raise traditional equity capital. In addition, he argues that coops often have slow and inefficient decision-making processes which will hamper them in their ability to compete successfully. Finally, he points out there is the risk that platform coops will go "bad" becoming an exclusive club for their members (for example, a ride-sharing coop might end up controlled only by drivers who then exploit consumers). Evgeny Morozov writes that "Efforts at platform cooperativism are worthwhile; occasionally, they do produce impressive and ethical local projects. There is no reason why a cooperative of drivers in a small town cannot build an app to help them beat Uber locally. But there is also no good reason to believe that this local cooperative can actually build a self-driving car: this requires massive investment and a dedicated infrastructure to harvest and analyze all of the data. One can, of course, also create data ownership cooperatives but it's unlikely they will scale to a point of competing with Google or Amazon."

While this may be true in certain sectors, Arun Sundararajan claims that, "Economic theory suggests that worker cooperatives are more efficient than shareholder corporations when there isn't a great deal of diversity in the levels of contribution across workers, when the level of external competition is low, and when there isn't the need for frequent investments in response to technological change." Using Uber as an example of a dominant platform, he continues: "Cab drivers, after all, offer a more or less uniform service in an industry with a limited amount of competition. Once the technology associated with 'e-hail' is commoditized, the potential for a worker cooperative appears to be in place, since each local market is contestable."

Regardless, the possibility of dominant platforms turning the flows of data they receive from their larger user-bases into market-securing technological innovations remains a challenge. For example, Uber seeks to use the data they currently collect from drivers using their app to automate the taxi industry, thus eliminating the need for their workforce altogether and likely dropping the value of a ride below that on which a human laborer can survive.

Difficulty securing early-stage capital

Though Sundararajan believes there are markets in which platform cooperatives might thrive, he finds their primary barrier to entry to be the initial securing of funds, especially given their ideological devaluation of the need to generate profits for investor-stakeholders. He does note, however, that a number of alternative fundraising models may pave the way for the widespread market-entry of platform cooperatives. Among those he mentions is Fairshare, a stakeholder model that differentiates between founders, workers, users, and investors, each with distinct voting rights, payouts, and permissions to trade shares on the open market. Other models he mentions include crypto-coin crowdfunding, philanthropic investment, and "provider stock ownership programs" that mimic the traditional joint-ownership form of the "employee stock ownership program".

See also

 Commons-based peer production
 Cooperative
 Sharing economy
 Solidarity economy
 Unionized cooperative
 Workers' self-management

References 

Cooperatives
Sharing economy
Business models
Corporate law